Tetracha distinguenda is a species of tiger beetle that was described by Dejean in 1831, and can be found in Falcón, Venezuela.

References

Beetles described in 1831
Endemic fauna of Venezuela
Beetles of South America
Cicindelidae